You're a Good Sport, Charlie Brown is the 14th prime-time animated television special based on the comic strip Peanuts by Charles M. Schulz. It was originally aired on the CBS network on October 28, 1975. In this special, Charlie Brown, Snoopy, and Peppermint Patty participate in a motocross race.

This was the final Peanuts special scored by John Scott Trotter, and penultimate with music by Vince Guaraldi.

Plot 
Snoopy and Woodstock partake in a tennis match while Linus and Sally are unable to play because of the courts being occupied. Sally tries to intimidate those playing by stating "her boyfriend" was going to clobber them, causing Linus to flee. After failing to beat Woodstock, Snoopy destroys his racket in frustration.

Peppermint Patty arrives on a small motorcycle and alerts the kids about an upcoming motocross race, and suggests that Charlie Brown and Snoopy enter. Linus volunteers to be the pit crew and the two pool their limited financial resources to purchase a shabby old bike. Snoopy enters the race under the pseudonym of The Masked Marvel and Marcie is on hand as the announcer. Charlie Brown and Snoopy crash within minutes of the start of the race at the first turn, and an ambulance shuttles them off for immediate medical care.

In the confusion, Snoopy is admitted to a regular hospital while Charlie Brown ends up at the vet. After regaining consciousness, Charlie Brown escapes from the vet and retrieves Snoopy from the hospital. Upon return, Linus informs Charlie Brown that motocross rules dictate that you must be fitted with a helmet, but Charlie Brown's old helmet was lost in the crash. So Linus proceeds to outfit Charlie Brown with a hollowed-out pumpkin he found in the pumpkin patch as a helmet (while Sally points out not mentioning the Great Pumpkin) and Charlie Brown, demoralized with such ridiculous headgear, returns to the race to follow the helmet requirement rule.

As the race continues, every other competitor falls victim to various mishaps (particularly assorted mud-traps) leaving Charlie Brown as the only contender left to cross the finish line (his battered bike proves to have amazing durability, despite its poor speed). Then he discovers that those who sanctioned the race could not obtain the intended grand prize of Pro Bowl tickets. As a consolation prize, Charlie Brown is given: a kiss from Loretta, the unspeakably-plain "Motocross Queen"; and a certificate for five free haircuts, which is a white elephant for him since (1) his dad is a barber and (2) Charlie has very little hair to be cut. Linus consoles Charlie Brown by telling him that the fact that he won against overwhelming odds is more important than receiving a prize, which Charlie Brown finds most uplifting for his spirits.

In the final scene, a confident Charlie Brown is ready to pitch another baseball game, saying to the team that in spite of his 980 straight defeats, has come to understand what winning is, and is certain that he will win this game. Instead, a line drive plows past him, causing his clothes to go flying in all directions, bringing him back to his failure life all over again.

Voice cast
Duncan Watson as Charlie Brown
 Peter Robbins – Charlie Brown's screaming voice (archived)
Liam Martin as Linus van Pelt 
Gail Davis as Sally Brown 
Melanie Kohn as Lucy van Pelt/Loretta
Stuart Brotman as Peppermint Patty
Jimmy Ahrens as Marcie
Bill Melendez as Snoopy/Woodstock

Credits
 Written and Created by: Charles M. Schulz
 A Lee Mendelson-Bill Melendez Production
 Directed by: Phil Roman
 Produced by: Bill Melendez
 Executive Producer: Lee Mendelson
 Music Composed and Performed by: Vince Guaraldi
 Music Supervised by: John Scott Trotter
 Designed by: Bernard Gruver, Evert Brown, Dean Spille
 Animation by: Sam Jaimes, Don Lusk, Bill Littlejohn, Bob Carlson
 Assisted by: Al Pabian, Larry Leichliter, Joe Roman, Patricia Joy, Larry Huber, Jeff Hall
 Painting Supervisor: Joanne Lansing
 Painted by: Eve Fletcher, Marie White, Chandra Poweris, Sheri Barstad, Brigitte Strother, Pat Capozzi, Adele Lenart, Valerie Pabian, Robyn Roberts
 Editing: Chuck McCann, Roger Donley
 Production Manager: Carole Barnes
 Recording: Coast Recorders, Radio Recorders
 Dubbing: Producers' Sound Service · Don Minkler
 Camera: Dickson/Vasu, Tony Rivetti
 Production Assistant: Sandy Claxton
 In cooperation with United Feature Syndicate, Inc. and Charles M. Schulz Creative Associates
 THE END "You're a Good Sport, Charlie Brown" © 1975 United Feature Syndicate, Inc.

Production notes

Voice talent
You're a Good Sport, Charlie Brown was Duncan Watson's second time voicing Charlie Brown — his first was the previous special, Be My Valentine, Charlie Brown, and he would return for the 1976 special Happy Anniversary, Charlie Brown and the feature film, Race for Your Life, Charlie Brown in 1977.

Music score
 was the last Peanuts television special to air during Vince Guaraldi's lifetime. Guaraldi died of a sudden heart attack on February 6, 1976, several hours after he had finished recording music cues for the television special It's Arbor Day, Charlie Brown. That special aired posthumously on March 16, 1976.  was also the last Peanuts special conducted and arranged by John Scott Trotter, who died on October 29, 1975 — one day after the special was broadcast. Trotter had worked in conjunction with Guaraldi on every Peanuts television special starting with It's the Great Pumpkin, Charlie Brown (1966).

All music cues were composed by Guaraldi and recorded by the Vince Guaraldi Trio on September 12 and 24, 1975, at Wally Heider Studios, featuring Seward McCain (electric bass) and Mark Rosengarden (drums).

The program's theme song, "Motocross" is performed in nine different variations. As the variations are difficult to distinguish, scene descriptions in which they appear are added to help differentiate.

"Motocross" (version 1; cold open)
"Peppermint Patty" (Linus and Sally tennis)
"Centercourt" (version 1)
"Fanfare"
"Bass Blues"
"Linus and Lucy" (bridge section) (football)
"Motocross" (version 2; Charlie Brown and Linus purchase motorbike)
"Motocross" (version 3; Marcie interviews contestants, Charlie Brown and Snoopy wipe out; aka Cue 9)
"Great Pumpkin Waltz"
"Motocross" (version 4; Charlie Brown and Snoopy re-enter competition)
"Lemonade Break"
"Motocross" (version 5; three contestants left)
"Motocross" (version 6; Snoopy converts tennis ball launcher into motorbike)
"Lunch Theme"
"Motocross" (version 7; final lap)
"Centercourt" (version 2; Charlie Brown's new beginning)
"Motocross" (version 8; end credits)

However, recording session master tapes for seven 1970s-era Peanuts television specials scored by Guaraldi were discovered by his son, David Guaraldi, in the mid-2000s. The songs "Motocross" (version 3; aka "Cue 9") and "Centercourt" were released on the compilation album, Vince Guaraldi and the Lost Cues from the Charlie Brown Television Specials (2007). A live version of "Centercourt" (retitled "") appeared on the compilation album Oaxaca in 2004.

Awards
You're a Good Sport, Charlie Brown won Schulz his third Emmy Award for Outstanding Children Special. He previously earned the award for A Charlie Brown Christmas and A Charlie Brown Thanksgiving.

References

External links 
 

1970s animated television specials
CBS television specials
Peanuts television specials
Television shows directed by Phil Roman
CBS original programming
1970s American television specials
1975 television specials
1975 in American television
American auto racing films
Motorcycle racing films
Animated films about auto racing
Sports animation